Rozhen Peninsula extends 9 km in the southwest direction towards Barnard Point, Livingston Island in the South Shetland Islands, Antarctica, and 8.8 km wide. It is bounded by False Bay and its segment Inept Cove to the west, Bransfield Strait to the southeast and Brunow Bay to the east.  Its interior is occupied by the Friesland Ridge of Tangra Mountains.

The peninsula is named after Rozhen site in Pirin Mountain, Bulgaria.

Location

See also
 Friesland Ridge
 Livingston Island

Maps
 L.L. Ivanov et al. Antarctica: Livingston Island and Greenwich Island, South Shetland Islands. Scale 1:100000 topographic map. Sofia: Antarctic Place-names Commission of Bulgaria, 2005.
 L.L. Ivanov. Antarctica: Livingston Island and Greenwich, Robert, Snow and Smith Islands. Scale 1:120000 topographic map. Troyan: Manfred Wörner Foundation, 2010.  (First edition 2009. )
 Antarctic Digital Database (ADD). Scale 1:250000 topographic map of Antarctica. Scientific Committee on Antarctic Research (SCAR). Since 1993, regularly upgraded and updated.
 L.L. Ivanov. Antarctica: Livingston Island and Smith Island. Scale 1:100000 topographic map. Manfred Wörner Foundation, 2017.

References
 Rozhen Peninsula. SCAR Composite Antarctic Gazetteer
 Ivanov, L. General Geography and History of Livingston Island. In: Bulgarian Antarctic Research: A Synthesis. Eds. C. Pimpirev and N. Chipev. Sofia: St. Kliment Ohridski University Press, 2015. pp. 17–28. 
 Bulgarian Antarctic Gazetteer. Antarctic Place-names Commission. (details in Bulgarian, basic data in English)

External links
 Rozhen Peninsula. Copernix satellite image

Peninsulas of Livingston Island